Ryan Al-Mousa (born 24 July 1994) is a Saudi professional footballer who plays as a defensive midfielder for Pro League club Damac.

Club career
He started out at Al-Ahli at the youth academy where he developed his talent, and was loaned to Al-Raed in 2017. He made 6 appearances, 1 start, before returning to Al-Ahli at the end of the season. On 9 July 2017 he joined Al-Taawoun on loan until the end of the 2017–18 season.

On 22 July 2022, Al-Mousa joined Damac on a three-year deal.

Honours 
Al-Ahli
 Saudi Professional League: 2015-16
 King Cup: 2016
 Saudi Crown Prince Cup: 2014–15

Al-Taawoun
 King Cup: 2019

References

External links 
 

Living people
Al-Ahli Saudi FC players
Al-Raed FC players
Al-Taawoun FC players
Damac FC players
Saudi Professional League players
Saudi Arabian footballers
Association football midfielders
1994 births